Sebastián Alfonso de la Rosa Peláez (born 20 January 1963) is a Mexican politician affiliated with the PT. He currently serves as Deputy of the LXII Legislature of the Mexican Congress representing Guerrero.

References

1963 births
Living people
Politicians from Oaxaca
Party of the Democratic Revolution politicians
21st-century Mexican politicians
Autonomous University of Guerrero alumni
Members of the Congress of Guerrero
Deputies of the LXII Legislature of Mexico
Members of the Chamber of Deputies (Mexico) for Guerrero